John Thomas Harris (May 8, 1823 – October 14, 1899) was a nineteenth-century politician, lawyer and judge from Virginia. He was often referred to after the American Civil War as "Judge Harris", even after his election to Congress. He was the first cousin of John Hill.

Early and family life

Born in Browns Gap, Virginia, Harris completed academic studies and studied law.

Career
Admitted to the bar in 1845, Harris began his legal practice in Harrisonburg, Virginia. He was elected the commonwealth attorney for Rockingham County, Virginia and served from 1852 to 1859.

He won election as an Independent Democrat to the United States House of Representatives in 1858, serving from 1859 to 1861. He ran for reelection, but the seat was terminated from Congress due to Virginia's secession from the Union on April 17, 1861. Harris initially vehemently opposed secession, including in a large political rally in Rockbridge, but George Deneale took the opposite position, and Harris later lobbied voters to elect delegates who would allow a referendum on secession, which passed nearly unanimously in the county.

American Civil War
Rockbridge voters elected Harris to the Virginia House of Delegates, and served from 1863 to 1865.

Return to Congress
After the war's end, Harris became judge of the twelfth judicial circuit of Virginia from 1866 to 1869. He became known for his "frank and manly" acceptance of the war's results, including his charge to the grand jury on May 11, 1867, exhorting members to do their duty "without fear or favor."

Upon Virginia's adopting a new Constitution which forbad slavery and thus allowed its readmission to the Union in 1869, and restoration of civil rights to Confederate officials, Harris ran for the House of Representatives at a special election held in July 1869, but lost.

The following year, 1870, voters sent him back to the U.S. Congress as a Democrat, and he won re-election several times, serving from 1871 to 1881. However, the numbering of the district Harris represented changed from Virginia's 6th District to Virginia's 7th District in 1872 due to reapportionment after the 1870 census. A White supremacist he opposed Civil Rights for African Americans.

Harris chaired the Committee on Elections from 1875 to 1879 and chairman of the Committee on Revision of Laws from 1879 to 1881. Harris declined a unanimous renomination in 1880. After a contested election, his successor as Commonwealth Attorney (and former state Senator) John Paul succeeded him for one term, and was succeeded by the Charles Triplett O'Ferrall, whom Harris had defeated in 1872 and 1874.

Harris served as chairman of the Virginia Democratic Convention in 1884, and was a commissioner to the 1893 World's Columbian Exposition in Chicago, Illinois.

Death and legacy
He died in Harrisonburg, Virginia on October 14, 1899 and was interred there in Woodbine Cemetery. His papers are held in the special collections division of the James Madison University library.

Electoral history

1870; Harris was elected to the U.S. House of Representatives unopposed.
1872; Harris was re-elected with 61.79% of the vote, defeating Independent Charles T. O'Ferrall.
1874; Harris was re-elected with 73.6% of the vote, defeating Republican John F. Lewis and Independents John F. Early and O'Ferrall.
1876; Harris was re-elected with 73.28% of the vote, defeating Republican Everett W. Early.
1878; Harris was re-elected with 56.46% of the vote, defeating Conservative John Paul.

References

1823 births
1899 deaths
Members of the Virginia House of Delegates
Virginia lawyers
People from Harrisonburg, Virginia
People of Virginia in the American Civil War
Virginia Independents
Independent Democrat members of the United States House of Representatives
Democratic Party members of the United States House of Representatives from Virginia
19th-century American politicians
19th-century American judges
19th-century American lawyers
Virginia circuit court judges